György Cséke (born 7 April 1983 in Nyíregyháza) is a Hungarian football player who retired in 2016. He played his last professional game with a Fort Lauderdale-based NPSL club Storm FC. against Jacksonville United. He currently works as a private soccer coach in Florida and is ranked 1st in the state.

Club career

Nyíregyháza Spartacus FC 
He made his debut on 4 September 2007 against ETO Győr FC in a match that ended 1–0.

Budapest Honved
He made his debut on 19 September 2009 against Diósgyőri VTK in a match that ended 2–1.

Storm FC 
He made his debut in 2014 in a match against Miami United FC that ended in a 2- 4 loss.

Club honours

Budapest Honvéd FC
Hungarian Super Cup:
Runners-up: 2009

References

1983 births
Living people
People from Nyíregyháza
Hungarian footballers
Association football defenders
Bőcs KSC footballers
Tuzsér SE footballers
Nyíregyháza Spartacus FC players
Hungarian expatriate footballers
Budapest Honvéd FC players
Hungarian expatriate sportspeople in the United States
Expatriate soccer players in the United States
Sportspeople from Szabolcs-Szatmár-Bereg County